Butuga II (938–961 CE) became the ruler of the Western Ganga Dynasty after his elder brother Rachamalla III.

Relations with Rashtrakutas
In order to ascend the throne he had to first seek help from the Rashtrakutas who were hitherto their arch enemies. Butuga II first helped Amoghavarsha III regain many lost territories and in turn was helped by the Rashtrakuta ruler to overthrow Rachamalla III, the unpopular Ganga king at that time. This helped forge a strong relationship between the Gangas and the Rashtrakutas, an alliance that lasted till the end of both kingdoms. Butuga II became the son-in-law of Amoghavarsha III by marrying his daughter Revakanimmadi. He also helped the Rashtrakutas defeat the Cholas in c. 949 in the Battle of Takkolam when he killed the Chola monarch Rajaditya with a well aimed arrow when the Chola was seated on his elephant. As a Rashtrakuta feudatory, he not only ruled Gangavadi but also many areas in the Malaprabha River basin and the Krishna River-Tungabhadra doab. With his immense contribution to a Rashtrakuta victory over the Cholas, Butuga II also took charge of the Banavasi region as a fief from Rashtrakuta  King Krishna III.

He was not only a valorous soldier but also a noted scholar. He is said to have a defeated a Buddhist scholar in a religious discourse and the Kudlur record speaks of him as a noted poet.

References

 Dr. Suryanath U. Kamat, Concise history of Karnataka, 2001, MCC, Bangalore (Reprint 2002)

External links
 History of Karnataka by Dr.Arthikaje
 History of Ganga Dynasty - Dr. Jyotsna Kamat

10th-century Indian monarchs
People of the Western Ganga dynasty
961 deaths